Darius Lamar Jennings (born June 28, 1992) is an American football wide receiver and return specialist who is a free agent. He was signed by the Cleveland Browns as an undrafted free agent in 2015 and played college football at Virginia. Jennings has also played for the Chicago Bears, New York Jets and Tennessee Titans.

Early years
Darius Jennings was born on June 28, 1992 in Baltimore, Maryland. He attended and played high school football at The Gilman School.

College career
During his college career at Virginia, Jennings had 133 receptions for 1,667 yards with 11 touchdowns. He majored in sociology.

Collegiate statistics

Professional career

Cleveland Browns

2015 season: Rookie year
Jennings signed with the Cleveland Browns as an undrafted free agent in May 2015. He started the season on the practice squad and was promoted to the active roster in early December. Jennings was waived by the Browns on December 16, 2015, but was re-signed on December 22.

Jennings played in four games for the Browns in 2015, catching 14 passes for 117 yards.

2016 season
On April 4, 2016, the Browns re-signed Jennings. On September 3, 2016, he was released by the Browns. The next day, he was signed to the Browns' practice squad. He was released on October 6, 2016.

Chicago Bears
On October 10, 2016, Jennings was signed to the Chicago Bears' practice squad. He was released by the Bears on November 22, 2016.

New York Jets
On December 6, 2016, Jennings was signed to the New York Jets' practice squad. He signed a reserve/future contract with the Jets on January 2, 2017. On April 26, 2017, Jennings was waived by the Jets.

Tennessee Titans

2017 season
On May 19, 2017, Jennings signed with the Tennessee Titans. He was waived on September 2, 2017 and was signed to the Titans' practice squad the next day. He was promoted to the active roster on September 23, 2017. He was waived on November 25, 2017 and was re-signed back to the practice squad.

2018 season
Jennings signed a reserve/future contract with the Titans on January 15, 2018. In the season opener against the Miami Dolphins, Jennings scored his first NFL touchdown after returning a 94-yard kickoff return during the fourth quarter as the Titans lost by a score of 27–20. During Week 9 against the Dallas Cowboys, he caught a 36-yard pass despite three defenders around him in the second quarter. He finished the 28-14 road victory with 36 receiving yards and 23 return yards. In the next game against the New England Patriots, Jennings returned the opening kickoff for 58 yards and recorded a 21-yard pass completion to quarterback Marcus Mariota, the first of his career as the Titans won 34-10.

Jennings finished the 2018 season with 22 kickoff returns for 698 yards and a touchdown. His 31.7 yards set a franchise record for average kickoff returns that also led the NFL. He also caught 11 receptions for 101 yards and rushed once for two yards.

2019 season
Jennings was released by the Titans on October 31, 2019. Prior to his release, he caught two passes for 17 yards and returned seven kicks for 147 yards. He was re-signed on December 23, 2019.

In the postseason, Jennings returned three kicks for 60 yards before the Titans were defeated by the Kansas City Chiefs in the AFC Championship Game.

Los Angeles Chargers
On March 30, 2020, Jennings was signed by the Los Angeles Chargers. He was released on September 5, 2020.

Detroit Lions
On August 9, 2021, Jennings signed with the Detroit Lions. He was released on August 23, 2021.

NFL statistics

Regular season

Postseason

Personal life
During the 2018 offseason, Jennings took part in the NFLPA’s Externship Program with Events DC and Under Armour. He helps out with "Next One Up," an organization helping inner-city high school athletes in Baltimore. He also worked as a camp counselor at his alma mater, The Gilman (Md.) School, helping middle schoolers with classwork and activities.

References

External links
Cleveland Browns bio
Tennessee Titans bio
Virginia Cavaliers bio

1992 births
Living people
Players of American football from Baltimore
American football wide receivers
American football return specialists
Virginia Cavaliers football players
Cleveland Browns players
Chicago Bears players
New York Jets players
Tennessee Titans players
Los Angeles Chargers players
Detroit Lions players